Ems-Oriental ("Eastern Ems";) was a department of the First French Empire in present-day Germany. It was formed in 1810, when the Kingdom of Holland was annexed by France. Its territory is part of the present-day German region of East Frisia in Lower Saxony. Its capital was Aurich. The department was subdivided into the following arrondissements and cantons (situation in 1812):

 Aurich, cantons: Aurich, Berum, Norden and Timmel. 
 Emden, cantons: Emden, Leer, Oldersum, Pewsum and Stickhausen. 
 Jever, cantons: Esens, Hooksiel, Jever, Rüstringen and Wittmund.

Its population in 1812 was 128,200.

After Napoleon was defeated in 1814, the department became part of the Kingdom of Hanover.

References

Former departments of France in Germany
History of East Frisia
1810 establishments in the First French Empire